USS Gazelle was a side-wheel steamer acquired by the Union Navy for duty with the Mississippi River Squadron.

Commissioned at Cairo, Illinois, in 1864 

She was the first ship to be named Gazelle by the Navy after being purchased at Cincinnati, Ohio, 21 November 1863, as the Emma Brown. She was commissioned February 1864 at Cairo, Illinois., with Acting Master Charles Thatcher in command.

Civil War operations 
 
Gazelle reached the mouth of the Red River in time to join Admiral David Dixon Porter’s joint Army-Navy expedition of 12 March-22 May 1864. The operation was part of the campaign against Texas designed to gain a strong foothold there and to thwart the French intervention in Mexico.

Serving between the mouth of the Red River and Grand Ecore, Louisiana, Gazelle engaged enemy shore units, convoyed Union Army transports, and patrolled the river while Union Navy gunboats assisted in the capture of Fort De Russy.

For the next year the ship patrolled between the mouth of the Red River and Morganza, Louisiana, and convoyed transports. On 24 May 1865 she embarked Confederate Generals Simon Bolivar Buckner, Sr., and Sterling Price at the mouth of the Red River and brought them to Baton Rouge, Louisiana, to negotiate a surrender with General Edward Canby. Subsequently, following repairs at New Orleans, Louisiana, Gazelle steamed upriver to Mound City, Illinois., arriving 25 June.

Decommissioning 

She decommissioned there 7 July 1865; she was sold 17 August 1865 to Henry Scott et al. She was redocumented as Plain City 23 October and operated until abandoned in 1869.

References 

Ships of the Union Navy
Steamships of the United States Navy
Gunboats of the United States Navy
American Civil War patrol vessels of the United States
1863 ships